Dr. Mohamed Ghazali bin Abdul Rashid or better known by his pen name Malim Ghozali PK (4 March 1949 – 18 June 2020) was a Malaysian writer and laureate from Perak. He was crowned as the Sasterawan Perak (Writer of Perak) in 2014. He authored a variety of literary works such as Novels and short stories. He also received numerous awards including the Southeast Asian Writers Award (SEA Award) in 2013.

Early life and education
Mohamed Ghazali bin Abdul Rashid was born in Malim Nawar, Perak on 4 March 1949.

He began his studies at Sekolah Melayu Gunung Panjang before continuing his studies at Sekolah Menengah Anderson Ipoh. He then went on to graduate from the University of Malaya and graduated with a Bachelor of Arts in 1973. In addition, he also participated in the Creative Writing Fellowship program at the Center for Creative Arts in Virginia, United States.

Career and award
He received the Southeast Asian Writers Award in 2013 and Sasterawan Perak title in 2014. He was also a nominee for the 14th Malaysian National Scholar Award.

Death
On Thursday, 18 June 2020, he died of cancer at Serdang Hospital, Selangor at 11.20 am. His death occurred after a surgery to remove the tumor on the heart the day before. His funeral prayer was held in Surau Ad Duha, Kota Damansara after Asr, and was buried in Kota Damansara Islamic Cemetery in Petaling Jaya, Selangor. He is survived by two widows and six children.

Bibliography

Storybook

Novel

Collections and anthologies

Translations

Articles

References

Books

External links
 Malim Ghozali PK on Facebook

1949 births
2020 deaths
Malaysian writers
Malaysian novelists
Malaysian people of Malay descent
People from Perak
Malaysian screenwriters
University of Malaya alumni
Deaths from cancer in Malaysia